The 1947 St Helier Circuit was a 5.149 km (3.199 m) Grand Prix road course in the town of Saint Helier, the capital of Jersey  which is the largest of the North Sea Channel Islands (English Channel), hosting four consecutive Grand Prix events (official name: J.C.C. Jersey Road Race) from 1947 to 1950, the last one a Formula One non-championship round. The circuit length remained largely the same over its four editions except for small variances within 100 meters. British entries with Peter Whitehead, Reg Parnell, Raymond Mays, Peter Walker, Cuth Harrison, Leslie Johnson and David Hampshire among many others dominated the series, winning all events over many top drivers of the era.

J.C.C. Jersey Road Race 1947-1950

Jersey Road Race - Notable Drivers
Louis Chiron - B. Bira - Raymond Sommer - Luigi Villoresi - Giuseppe Farina - Emmanuel de Graffenried - Clemar Bucci - Jean-Pierre Wimille - Louis Rosier

References

Saint Helier
Defunct motorsport venues in the United Kingdom
Saint Helier